Imad Najah (born 19 February 1991) is a Moroccan professional footballer who last played as a defensive midfielder for Vitesse II.

Career
Born in Utrecht, Netherlands, Najah has played club football for PSV and RKC Waalwijk.

Najah represented Morocco at the 2012 Summer Olympics.

Personal
He is the older brother of Anass Najah.

References

1991 births
Living people
Footballers from Utrecht (city)
Moroccan footballers
Morocco youth international footballers
Dutch footballers
Dutch sportspeople of Moroccan descent
Moroccan expatriate footballers
PSV Eindhoven players
RKC Waalwijk players
SBV Vitesse players
Association football midfielders
Eredivisie players
USV Elinkwijk players